The 32nd Golden Melody Awards  take place in Taipei, Taiwan in 2021. The ceremony was scheduled for 26 June 2021 in Taipei Arena, but rescheduled to 21 August, due to the COVID-19 pandemic, and moved to the Taipei Music Center. This marked the second time GMA was held in the midst of COVID-19 pandemic after the 31st edition, both of which was held at the same location.

Winners and nominees 
Below is the list of winners and nominees for the popular music categories.

References 

2021 in Taiwan
2021 music awards
Golden Melody Awards
Music events postponed due to the COVID-19 pandemic
August 2021 events in Asia